Tandsbyns FK is a Swedish football club located in Tandsbyn.

Background
The club was originally known as Tandsbyns IF and dates back to 1945. It was active in football, athletics, cycling and all kinds of winter sports.  In 1991 a separate football club was established in collaboration with another club and was named T/F-91 (Tandsbyn/Fåker-91). In 1996/97 this club was forced to disband but in 1998 Tandsbyns FK was formed for boys and girls in the Tandsbyn area. In the spring of 2003 the club's oldest boys entered Division 5 and won the league title convincingly to gain promotion to Division 4 where the club currently remains.

Tandsbyns FK plays in Swedish football Division 4 Jämtland/Härjedalen which is the fifth tier of Swedish football. They play their home matches at the Tandsbyn Nya IP in Tandsbyn.

The club is affiliated to Jämtland-Härjedalens Fotbollförbund.  Tandsbyns IF entered the Svenska Cupen on 4 occasions.

Squad
Goalkeepers: Adalbert Matros Serhii Serhii.

Defenders: Petter Nachmanson, Robin Peter Sprängberg, Mac’n’cheese Kristensson.

Midfielders: Edvin (Täpac) Johannesson, Tony Arnqvist, Joel Johansson, Robin Karlsson, Stefan Odin.

Forwards: Lucas Johansson, Fredrik Palmäng Ez, Wiliam Tadese, Fredrik Festin.

Season to season

Footnotes

External links
 Tandsbyns FK – Official website

Football clubs in Jämtland County